Navajo Dam is a dam on the San Juan River, a tributary of the Colorado River, in northwestern New Mexico in the United States. It was built by the U.S. Bureau of Reclamation (Reclamation) in the 1960s to provide flood control, irrigation, domestic and industrial water supply, and storage for droughts. A small hydroelectric power plant was added in the 1980s.

The dam is a major feature of the Colorado River Storage Project, which is designed to regulate water resources across the entire Upper Colorado River Basin. The reservoir, Navajo Lake, is a popular recreation area and one of the largest bodies of water in New Mexico, with its upper portion extending into Colorado.

Specifications

Navajo is a rolled earthfill embankment dam, composed of three "zones" of alternating cobbles, gravel, sand and clay. The dam contains  of material. Navajo Lake extends for  up the San Juan River,  up the Los Pinos River (Pine River) and  up the Piedra River.

Prior to the dam's construction, the San Juan River flow was high during spring snowmelt and summer monsoon, and a relative trickle at other times of the year. The dam has enabled a constant water flow throughout the year which benefits water supply, recreation, and flood control. Hydropower generated at Navajo Dam serves about 37,000 customers in northwest New Mexico and averaged a production of 135,226,000 kilowatt hours for the period 1989–1999.

When the dam was first constructed, water releases were prioritized to meet irrigation demands and provide flood control; however, since the late 1990s the operating criteria have been changed in order to meet environmental restoration goals in the San Juan River (see below).

Navajo Dam is part of the federal Colorado River Storage Project (CRSP), a massive system of dams, reservoirs and irrigation projects across the Upper Colorado River Basin. Operations at Navajo Dam are crucial to ensuring enough water is available for both local San Juan basin users and contract holders of the San Juan-Chama Project, which diverts water from the San Juan River to the Rio Grande valley serving Albuquerque, New Mexico. At Navajo Dam, a large fraction of San Juan River water is diverted into the Navajo Indian Irrigation Project (NIIP), which irrigates  of farmland to the south of the river. About , or 30 percent of the lake's capacity, are allocated to the NIIP. Both the San Juan-Chama and Navajo Irrigation Projects are participating units of the CRSP.

History
The first studies for a dam on the San Juan River were made in 1904, but there was little need for such a project at the time, due to the remoteness of the area. The growth of Farmington and surrounding towns in the 1920s due to agriculture and a petroleum boom created the need for additional water supply as well as flood control, both equal in importance due to the seasonal nature of the San Juan River. The Navajo Nation's growing population was suffering from food and employment shortages, which the Bureau of Reclamation envisioned could be solved by a large irrigation project. The 1908 Supreme Court decision Winters v. United States ruled that a federally established Indian reservation was "entitled to the water needed to create a permanent homeland". In other words, the reservation carried implicit water rights dating back to its creation in 1868; in this case, the Navajo peoples' rights to San Juan River water.

The high dam proposed for the San Juan River ultimately became part of the Bureau of Reclamation's Colorado River Storage Project. Navajo Dam was authorized by Congress in the Colorado River Storage Project Act of April 11, 1956, which also authorized Glen Canyon Dam and numerous irrigation and power projects along the Green River, Gunnison River and other tributaries. The initial authorization for Navajo Dam did not include the Navajo irrigation project, which was authorized much later, in June 1962, along with the San Juan-Chama diversion project.

Preparatory work at the Navajo Dam site started on October 8, 1956 with archaeological excavations of Native American sites along the canyons and bottom lands of the San Juan River; however, these investigations were limited in scope and only preserved a handful of artifacts from the area. A number of sites sacred to the Navajo people would later be flooded with the filling of the lake. Other features to be demolished or relocated included the towns of Rosa and Los Arboles, several cemeteries along the Los Pinos River, and sections of the Denver and Rio Grande Western Railroad. The primary construction contract for the dam was awarded to Morrison-Knudsen, Henry J. Kaiser Company, and F&S Contracting Company on June 25, 1958 and work began a month later on July 30.

The first facilities to be constructed were the water works allowing for diversion of the San Juan River. The main diversion tunnel was completed on January 27, 1959 and the auxiliary tunnel on April 27, 1959. Concrete lining was complete in October and the river was diverted on January 4, 1960 allowing the start of construction on the embankment dam. As the dam continued to rise, clearing operations in the reservoir basin began on June 30, 1961 and took about a year to complete. The concrete spillway, located to the west of the dam, was finished on September 15, 1961.

On June 27, 1962 the diversion tunnel was blocked, and water was stored in Navajo Lake for the first time. Navajo Lake was the first reservoir of the Colorado River Storage Project to begin filling; the next, Flaming Gorge, would not start filling until November. The main embankment was topped out shortly thereafter on August 22, 1962; however, work on other features of the project, including riprap placement and final concrete work, continued. The dam was dedicated on September 15, 1962 by Secretary of the Interior Stewart Udall, but was not formally completed until April 20, 1963. The total cost of the Navajo Dam project was about $35 million ($ in  dollars).

A number of cracks and small slides developed in the dam after its construction in 1964, but were either repaired or settled by themselves without significant structural damage. The dam abutments and the spillway leaked considerably until the 1970s, when the Bureau of Reclamation finally took corrective action by installing drainage systems and placing stabilizing fill. The canal head works and diversion tunnel for the Navajo Indian Irrigation Project were started in 1966 and were completed on July 3, 1967; this allowed the commencement of irrigation water deliveries from Navajo Lake, although the main canal was not completed to its full length until 1977. Operations of the irrigation system were transferred to the Bureau of Indian Affairs shortly thereafter. The reservoir did not fill completely until spring 1973, when it flowed over the spillway for the first time.

Also in 1973, the Bureau of Reclamation also began planning for a hydroelectric power plant at Navajo, which had not been included in the original design of the dam. Construction began in 1976, but was halted when the National Wildlife Federation sued, citing that fluctuating power releases into the San Juan River could cause environmental damage. As a result, Congress did not approve the project. However, in 1981 the city of Farmington applied to the Federal Energy Regulatory Commission for a permit to construct a private hydro power plant at the dam. The Navajo Nation protested, because if the power plant were to be constructed as a private project rather than a public Reclamation project, the Navajo would lose the potential benefits. Ultimately, the Navajo reached an agreement with the city and the power plant was approved for construction in 1986, with the first power generated in 1989.

Environmental impacts
Navajo Dam has greatly changed the ecology of part of the San Juan River, from a warm, muddy and highly seasonal river to a cold-water stream with relatively constant flow. The dam's impacts are most pronounced in the  stretch above Farmington (where the San Juan is joined by the mostly undammed Animas River and regains some of its seasonal variations); further downstream, the dam "apparently has had no significant effect" on the river channel and sediment flow. Under natural conditions, the San Juan River supported native fishes including Colorado pikeminnow, razorback sucker and roundtail chub, but these have been largely been eliminated in favor of rainbow trout, non-native (introduced) brown trout and other salmonids which thrive in the cold water released from the base of Navajo Dam. The San Juan is designated a Blue Ribbon fishery and is one of the most popular fly-fishing waters in the western United States.

After a federal biological assessment in 1999, the San Juan River Basin Recovery Implementation Program (SJRIP) was established in order to help recover native fish populations in the river. The peak release can be up to 60 days during wet years, but may be suspended during dry years depending on available reservoir storage and predicted inflow. In combination, these mimic historic high and low flow conditions in the San Juan River before the dam was built. The high flows have been observed to benefit trout, but the low flows have been estimated to result in a 34 percent reduction of trout habitat.

See also
List of dams in the Colorado River system
List of reservoirs and dams in the United States

References

Works cited

External links
Navajo Lake current levels
Interview with Leonard Trujillo, construction worker on Navajo Dam

Buildings and structures in Rio Arriba County, New Mexico
Buildings and structures in San Juan County, New Mexico
Dams in New Mexico
Colorado River Storage Project
United States Bureau of Reclamation dams
Dams completed in 1962
Earth-filled dams
Dams in the Colorado River basin
1962 establishments in New Mexico